The 1924 United States presidential election in Oregon took place on November 4, 1924, as part of the 1924 United States presidential election which was held throughout all contemporary 48 states. State voters chose five representatives, or electors to the Electoral College, who voted for president and vice president.

Background
Outside a few Presidential and gubernatorial elections, Oregon was a virtually one-party Republican state during the “System of 1896”, where the only competition was via Republican primaries. Apart from Woodrow Wilson’s two elections, during the first of which the GOP was severely divided, no Democrat since William Jennings Bryan in 1900 had carried a single county in the state.

Still, in the previous 1920 election Oregon saw less decline from Wilson’s 1916 support than any other state in the West or Plains, so that after being Wilson’s poorest state in this region it was James Cox’s strongest therein. Despite continuing overwhelming Republican dominance of the state legislature, 1922 had seen incumbent Governor Ben W. Olcott denounce the powerful Ku Klux Klan with the result that Democratic nominee Walter Pierce won the election on a platform to make attendance at public schools compulsory, without support from the more progressive faction of the dominant Republican Party. The 1922 House of Representatives elections also saw Oregon elect to the 3rd District its first Democratic representative since 1880 in Elton Watkins. Pierce did pass this law with overwhelming support from conservative Republicans in the legislature, only to find it overruled by both the Oregon Supreme Court and later federally in Pierce v. Society of Sisters.

However, the division of the Democratic Party over the Ku Klux Klan – which at the time all but ruled Oregon with its reputation for fanatical racism and anti-Catholicism – alongside maverick veteran Wisconsin Senator Robert La Follette’s decision to mount a third-party presidential campaign ensured by late summer that the Republicans would be unchallenged in carrying Oregon, especially after La Follette denounced the Klan, which was highly popular amongst working Oregonians.

Vote
Polls consistently showed that Oregon would remain firmly in Republican hands, and by mid-October it was clear that La Follette and Davis would run close for second place. Ultimately La Follette edged Davis out for second place by a mere 814 votes out of 279,488, although Oregon was still Davis’ best state west of the Continental Divide apart from the two less isolationist states of Southern-leaning Arizona and Mormon Utah, with the Democrat’s best vote coming from historically Democratic and Ozark mountaineer-settled Eastern Oregon. Coolidge nonetheless carried every county, and won all but two by double digits.

Results

Results by county

See also
 United States presidential elections in Oregon

Notes

References

Oregon
1924
1924 Oregon elections